Franz Lechleitner (born 11 September 1963) is an Austrian luger. He competed at the 1984 Winter Olympics and the 1988 Winter Olympics.

References

External links
 

1963 births
Living people
Austrian male lugers
Olympic lugers of Austria
Lugers at the 1984 Winter Olympics
Lugers at the 1988 Winter Olympics
People from Zams
Sportspeople from Tyrol (state)